Unsolved History is an American documentary television series that aired from 2002 to 2005. The program was produced by Termite Art Productions, Lions Gate Television, and Discovery Communications for the Discovery Channel. The series lasted over three seasons and had a total of 47 episodes, in which a team of people, each with different skills, try to solve historical mysteries. As of 2007, the series airs on Investigation Discovery and occasionally on the Science Channel. However, episodes regarding the military are sometimes aired on the Military Channel.

Episodes

Each episode contains an event in history that has never been conclusively solved. In every episode, a team of scientists tries to solve the case.

See also
List of programs broadcast by Discovery Channel

External links 
 

Television series about conspiracy theories
Discovery Channel original programming
Television series by Lionsgate Television
2000s American documentary television series
2002 American television series debuts
2005 American television series endings